Enrique David Borja García (born 30 December 1945) is a Mexican former professional footballer who played as a forward. Borja is the sixth all-time leading scorer of the Mexico national team.

Career
He played club football for UNAM until his transfer to Club América in 1969. He was the top scorer of Mexican league in the season 1970–1971 (24 goals), in 1971–1972 (26 goals) and in 1972–1973 (20 goals) and was a champion with the club on two occasions (1971 & 1976).

Borja played in two World Cups in 1966 and 1970.

He scored his lone World Cup goal in a group stage match against France in the 1966 edition, which ended in a 1–1 draw.

After retirement
Borja has been the club president of Club Necaxa and of the Federación Mexicana de Fútbol Asociación.

He was co-commentator for the American television network, Univision, for the FIFA World Cup Germany 2006 tournament (June – July 2006), with Fernando Fiore, a veteran Univision sports commentator.

On 31 October 2007 he signed as club president for Tigres UANL of Mexico after the destitution of Fernando Urdiales from the team. He was destituted of the Presidency of Tigres UANL 25 May 2009.

Honours
América
Mexican Primera División: 1970–71, 1975–76
Copa México: 1973–74
Campeón de Campeones: 1976
CONCACAF Champions' Cup: 1977

Individual
Mexican Primera División Top Scorer: 1970–71, 1971–72, 1972–73

Career statistics

International goals
Scores and results list Mexico's goal tally first.

External links
International statistics at rsssf

References

1945 births
Living people
Club Universidad Nacional footballers
Club América footballers
1966 FIFA World Cup players
1970 FIFA World Cup players
Mexico international footballers
Footballers from Mexico City
Liga MX players
Association football forwards
Mexican footballers